Akhenre Setepenre Siptah or Merenptah Siptah was the penultimate ruler of the Nineteenth Dynasty of Egypt. His father's identity is currently unknown. Both Seti II and Amenmesse have been suggested although the fact that Siptah later changed his royal name or nomen to Merneptah Siptah after his Year 2 suggests rather that his father was Merneptah. If correct, this would make Siptah and Seti II half-brothers since both of them were sons of Merneptah.

He was not the crown prince, but succeeded to the throne as a child after the death of Seti II. His accession date occurred on I Peret day 2 around the month of December.

Origins

Historically, it was believed that Tiaa, a wife of Seti II, was the mother of Siptah. This view persisted until it was eventually realized that a relief in the Louvre Museum (E 26901) "pairs Siptah's name together with the name of his mother" a certain Sutailja or Shoteraja.

Sutailja was a Canaanite rather than a native Egyptian name, which means that she was almost certainly a king's concubine from Canaan. However, Dodson/Hilton assert that this is not correct and that the lady was, instead, the mother of Ramesses-Siptah and a wife of Ramesses II.

The identity of his father is currently unknown; some Egyptologists speculate it may have been Amenmesse rather than Seti II since both Siptah and Amenmesse spent their youth in Chemmis and both are specifically excluded from Ramesses III's Medinet Habu procession of statues of ancestral kings unlike Merneptah or Seti. This suggests that Amenmesse and Siptah were inter-related in such a way that they were "regarded as illegitimate rulers and that therefore they were probably father and son." However, another interpretation here is that Siptah was regarded as illegitimate by the later 20th dynasty kings since Siptah required the assistance of Chancellor Bay to secure the kingship since he was just another minor son of Merneptah rather than a direct son of Seti II.

A headless statue of Siptah now in Munich shows him seated on the lap of another Pharaoh, presumably his father. The British Egyptologist Aidan Dodson states 
 The only ruler of the period who could have promoted such destruction was Amenmesse, and likewise he was the only king whose offspring would have required such explicit promotion. The demolition of this figure is likely to have closely followed the fall of Bay or the death of Siptah himself, when any short-lived rehabilitation of Amenmesse would have ended.
If Siptah was a son of Seti II, it is unlikely that he would have been considered as an illegitimate king by later 20th Dynasty New Kingdom pharaohs. Due to his youth and perhaps his problematic parentage, he was placed under the guidance of his stepmother—the queen regent Twosret.

Siptah ruled Egypt for almost six years as a young man. Siptah was only a child of ten or eleven years when he assumed power since a medical examination of his mummy reveals the king was about sixteen years old at death. He was tall at 1.6 metres, had curly reddish brown hair, and likely had poliomyelitis, with a deformed left foot.

Reign

Chancellor Bay publicly boasts that he was instrumental in installing Siptah on the throne in several inscriptions including an Aswan stela set up by Seti, the Viceroy of Kush and at Gebel el-Silsila. A key graffito located at the entrance to the Speos of Horemheb at Gebel el-Silsila depicts Bay standing in a pose of adoration directly behind Siptah, who is making an offering to Amun; a following inscription in the graffito reads:
the spirit of the Great Superintendent of the Seal of the entire land, who established the King [Siptah] in the place of his father; beloved of his lord, Bay.

Bay, however, later fell out of favor at court presumably for overreaching himself and last appears in public in a dated Year 4 inscription from Siptah's reign. He was executed in the fifth year of Siptah's reign, on orders of the king himself. News of his execution was passed to the Workmen of Deir el-Medina in Ostraca IFAO 1254. This ostraca was translated and published in 2000 by Pierre Grandet in a French Egyptological journal. Callendar notes that the reason for the king's message to the workmen was to notify them to cease all work on decorating Bay's tomb since Bay had now been deemed a traitor to the state.

Siptah himself is last attested sometime in his 6th regnal Year on a graffito located at the South Temple of Buhen. He likely died in the middle of II Akhet—perhaps around II Akhet 12 of his 6th Year. This assumes a traditional 70-day mummification period if Siptah was buried on IV Akhet 22.

Evidence for his burial on the latter date is recorded in ostracon O. Cairo CG 25792. This ostraca from Deir el-Medina mentions that the Vizier Hori visited the workmen of Deir el-Medina first on II Akhet 24 and second on IV Akhet 19. The final line on the ostracon reads as: "IV Akhet 22: Burial took place". Since this event can only refer to a king's burial, the question here is the identity of this king.

Hori was appointed vizier around Regnal Year 6 II Shemu 6 and I Peret [X] of Seti II's reign and held this office through the reigns of Siptah, Twosret and Setnakht and into that of Ramesses III. The ostracon could not refer to Setnakht's death because this king died on I Shemu 25 since his son, Ramesses III succeeded him the next day. Twosret was ousted from power by Setnakht; therefore, the burial does not refer to her either.

Seti II must have died in late IV Akhet or early I Peret—after the 70-day mummification period—since a graffito located above KV14, Twosret's tomb, records his burial on III Peret 11. Therefore, the IV Akhet 22 burial date likely records the burial of Siptah himself. Siptah's death would have occurred sometime around II Akhet 12. Siptah himself would have ruled Egypt for approximately 5 years and 10 months since his predecessor, Seti II, died around the end of IV Akhet and the beginning of I Peret, even if he did not legally assume the throne until the start of II Akhet with the aid of the powerful court official Bay.

After his death, Twosret simply assumed his Regnal Years and ruled Egypt as a queen for a year or two at the most. Siptah was buried in the Valley of the Kings, in tomb KV47, but his mummy was not found there. In 1898, it was discovered along with 18 others in a mummy cache within the (KV35) tomb of Amenhotep II. The study of his tomb shows that it was conceived and planned in the same style as those of Twosret and Bay, clearly part of the same architectural design.

In 1980, James Harris and Edward F. Wente conducted a series of X-ray examinations on New Kingdom Pharaohs crania and skeletal remains, which included the mummified remains of Siptah. The analysis in general found strong similarities between the New Kingdom rulers of the 19th Dynasty and 20th Dynasty with Mesolithic Nubian samples. The authors also noted affinities with modern Mediterranean populations of Levantine origin. Harris and Wente suggested this represented admixture as the Rammessides were of northern origin.

In April 2021 his mummy was moved from the Museum of Egyptian Antiquities to the National Museum of Egyptian Civilization along with those of 17 other kings and 4 queens in an event termed the Pharaohs' Golden Parade.

See also

KV47

References

12th-century BC Pharaohs
Pharaohs of the Nineteenth Dynasty of Egypt
Ancient child monarchs
Ancient Egyptian mummies
Year of birth unknown
1191 BC deaths
Royalty and nobility with disabilities